Tarzan, Lord of the Jungle is a novel by American writer Edgar Rice Burroughs, generally considered the eleventh in his series of twenty-four books about the title character Tarzan (the previous book, Tarzan and the Tarzan Twins, being omitted from the enumeration on the grounds that it was written for younger readers). It was first published as a serial in Blue Book Magazine from December 1927 through May 1928; it first appeared in book form in a hardcover edition from A. C. McClurg in September 1928.

Plot summary
Tarzan finds an outpost of European knights and crusaders from a "forbidden valley" hidden in the mountains, whose ancestors had gone astray en route to the Holy Land and ended up in the depth of Africa. The 20th century ones still maintain a Medieval European way of life, having split into two mutually-hostile factions. Tarzan's lion ally Jad-bal-ja puts in an appearance late in the book.

Importance
Tarzan, Lord of the Jungle marks an important transition in the plot-type presented in the Tarzan series, presaged by the earlier Tarzan the Untamed. Previous novels dealt primarily with the ape-man's own affairs and family; beginning with this novel, he becomes an apparently rootless adventurer serving as a savior and enabler of a cast of secondary characters which changes in each book. While a few previously established and new characters continue to appear, notably the lion Jad-bal-Ja, the monkey Nkima, and Muviro, sub-chief of Tarzan's Waziri tribe, along with his warriors, most formerly major characters are dropped aside from an occasional token appearance. The novel also continues the trend, first seen in The Return of Tarzan and established definitively in Tarzan the Untamed, of taking Tarzan to a new  lost civilization or  tribe in almost every book.

Comic adaptations
The book has been adapted into comic form by Gold Key Comics in Tarzan nos. 176-177, dated August–September 1969, with a script by Gaylord DuBois. Part of the art was based on lay-outs by Russ Manning.

References

External links
ERBzine.com Illustrated Bibliography entry for Edgar Rice Burroughs' Tarzan, Lord of the Jungle
Edgar Rice Burroughs Summary Project page for Tarzan, Lord of the Jungle

Text of the novel at Project Gutenberg Australia
Link to formatted ebook version on edgar-rice-burroughs-ebooks.blogspot.de

1928 American novels
1928 fantasy novels
A. C. McClurg books
Fictional knights
Novels adapted into comics
Novels first published in serial form
Novels set during the Crusades
Tarzan novels by Edgar Rice Burroughs
Works originally published in Blue Book (magazine)